Emily Drabinski is an academic librarian, author, teacher and president-elect of the American Library Association for 2023-24.

Early life and education
Drabinski grew up in Boise, Idaho, attending Madison Elementary School, North Junior High School and Boise High School while living in Idaho. She left Boise at age 18 in hopes of becoming a writer after attending Columbia University. Drabinski earned her Bachelor of Arts in Political Science from Columbia University in 1997. 

In 2001, she enrolled Syracuse University's Master of Library and Information Science program, and believed she would be working as a librarian who helped people "find books". At the time, she lived in New York City, took her classes online, and worked full-time at New York Public Library. She received her MLIS degree from Syracuse in 2003. She later earned a degree, in 2011, in Rhetoric and Composition from Long Island University, in order to become an academic librarian.

Career
Drabinkski's first professional librarian job was at Sarah Lawrence College, as an academic reference librarian from 2004 to 2008. Drabinski was an early member of Radical Reference, protesting the 2004 Republican National Convention in NYC and teaching fact-checking workshops for independent journalists. She remained a member in later years, participating in events from 2007-2010.

From 2008 to 2012, Drabinski served Electronic Resources and Instruction Librarian at Long Island University, Brooklyn. She also served as Coordinator of Library Instruction at the same university from 2012 to 2019. In 2011, she was a faculty librarian at LIU where she was on strike with fellow union members.

In 2016, she was co-chair of the Gender and Sexuality in Information Studies Colloquium, along with Baharak Yousefi and Tara Robertson. She was also editor of the Library Juice Press Series on Gender and Sexuality in Information Studies. She co-edited of Critical Library Instruction: Theories & Methods with Maria T. Accardi and Alana Kumbier.

In September 2016, Drabinski was secretary of the Long Island University Faculty Federation and participated actively in the protest by faculty and students at Long Island University - Brooklyn over a lockout associated with faculty contract negotiations. In an interview with Jacobin magazine at the time, she described the union as "fairly militant", argued that a "fair contract" was not proposed, and said there needs to be movement "toward meaningful shared governance" at the university. In April 2022, she stated that this lockout was when she learned about "forming collective power" among workers. From 2017 to 2020, she taught classes in the Syracuse University's iSchool’s MSLIS program.

Drabinski joined the faculty at the Graduate Center, CUNY in 2019 as Critical Pedagogy Librarian. In March 2020, just as lockdown began in NYC, she assumed the role of Interim Chief of the library, when her predecessor, Polly Thistlethwaite, became Interim University Dean for Library Services at CUNY. She also held a workshop at the Open Educational Resources bootcamp of CUNY in March 2019. In July 2022, she ended her role as Interim Chief Librarian, but continued to work at CUNY's Mina Rees Library.

In October 2021, the American Library Association announced Drabinski's candidacy for the office of President for the 2023-24 term. She has served as an American Library Association Councilor-at Large (2017-2020), as chair of the International Relations Committee, and as American Library Association, Association of College and Research Libraries chair and member of the Information Literacy Frameworks and Standards Committee. She argued that as president of the ALA, she would help build solidarity to "champion a treasured social institution" (librarianship) and help build "stronger connections between libraries...our communities and the communities we serve", and struggles everyone has in society because of "maldistribution of wealth." She also argued that the ALA needed a president who made public statements on the side of labor and teaching people about union organizing. 

On April 13, 2022, the ALA announced that she won the election as president against executive director of the Las Vegas-Clark County Library District, Kelvin Watson, receiving 5,410 votes, while Watson received 4,622 votes. Her tenure as president begins in July 2023. In November 2022, Drabinski was interviewed by Brooke Gladstone for On the Media about how libraries under attack need to change the narrative.

Research, teaching, and librarianship
Drabinski's research focuses on queer theory, library instruction and cataloging practice. She also has conducted research about reference services to incarcerated persons with scholar Deborah Rabina. Drabinski served as chair of the International Relations Committee  of the American Library Association, International Relations Committee. She is a member of the editorial board of the Journal of Philippine Librarianship & Information Studies published by the University of the Philippines School of Library and Information Studies. She has presented papers at international conferences in Zadar, Croatia; London, England; Quezon City, Manila; and at several conferences in Canada including Ottawa, Windsor, Edmonton and Vancouver.

Drabinski is currently on the editorial board of Radical Teacher. She also works as an adjunct professor at UCLA, and Rutgers. She was formerly a part-time faculty member at the Pratt School of Information where she taught a reference librarianship course.

Personal
In June 2020, during the COVID-19 quarantine, Drabinski and her partner, Karen Miller, a history professor at LaGuardia Community College and CUNY Graduate Center launched Homeschool Co-op 2020, inviting people to teach classes over Zoom for children and adults. Drabinski led a morning session every day at 8am Eastern Time called Cat Chat.

After her election as ALA president in June 2022, Drabinski described herself, in a tweet she later deleted, as a "Marxist lesbian" who believes in "collective power" and said that her mom was proud of her. Following the tweet, Tiffany Justice, co-founder of the conservative nonprofit, Moms for Liberty, claimed outside interference in libraries, asked "what’s in the libraries?" and promoted books written by partners of her organization. 

In an interview with the Toledo Blade, Drabinski acknowledged her comments on Twitter and called them "an excited utterance". She also said she is not an "evil Marxist lesbian" who wants to make others Marxists, but wants to promote, and build, enthusiasm for "amazing work" by librarians across the United States. She also argued that she is still a professional, regardless of these political views. Previously, in June 2020, she stated that current library classification has "no language" for queer people because "queer identity terms change so quickly" and said that such classification requires "fixed language...[and] there’s no way to change it quickly." 

She currently lives in Brooklyn with her partner, Karen Miller, their teenage son, and their three cats.

Honors and awards

Drabinski was a 2014 Library Journal Mover & Shaker Advocate, and winner of the Ilene F. Rockman Instruction Publication of the Year in 2015 for her article "Towards a Kairos of Library Instruction." She was honored with the Beta Phi Mu Harold Lancour Scholarship for Foreign Study in 2018.

Selected publications 

Drabinski, Emily. (2020) “Professionalism reconsidered.” Evidence-Based Library and Information Practice. 15, No. 20, 191-195.

Drabinski, Emily and Debbie Rabina. (2016) "Reference Services to Incarcerated People, Part II: Sources and Learning Outcomes."  Reference & User Services Quarterly,  55, No. (3), pp. 123-131.
Drabinski, Emily and Debbie Rabina. (2016)"Reference Services to Incarcerated People, Part I: Themes Emerging from Answering Reference Questions from Prisons and Jails."  Reference & User Services Quarterly,  55, No.(1), pp. 42-48.

References

External links
 Personal website
 Interview of Emily Drabinski by Graduate Center, CUNY in March 2022

American librarians
American women librarians
Academic librarians
Queer theorists
Long Island University faculty
Year of birth missing (living people)
Living people
Columbia College (New York) alumni
Syracuse University alumni
Long Island University alumni
Graduate Center, CUNY faculty
Presidents of the American Library Association
Lesbian academics
Lesbian trade unionists
Women Marxists